A Short History of Anarchism is a history of anarchism by Max Nettlau.

Contents 

The book outlines the development of anarchism internationally from 1789 to 1934. It covers individuals, organizations, and periodicals.

Publication 

Freedom Press published A Short History of Anarchism in 1996. The text is a translation of Historia de la anarquía (in Spanish), which itself had been edited from La anarquía a través de los tiempos. The original, which translates as "Anarchy in the Course of Time", was published in Barcelona in 1935 by Maucci, summarizing Nettlau's prior German print publications covering 1864–1886. He added six chapters to summarize 1886 to 1935. Nettlau did not finish nevertheless publish his history of anarchism at his death but the book samples from that work. Subsequent translated editions include Swedish (1954), Italian (1964), and French (1971).

Reception 

Closer to a biobibliography than an academic history, Nettlau shows intimate knowledge of the anarchist movement and personalities, but is more partisan and passionate in tone than detached and analytical. Revue française de science politique described the book as indispensable for anarchist studies.

References

Bibliography

External links 

 

1935 non-fiction books
Spanish-language books
Translations into English
History books about anarchism